"I Got Loaded" is a 1951 song by Peppermint Harris. The single was Harris's second and final chart hit, peaking at number one on the U.S. R&B chart.

References
 

1951 singles